Pilodeudorix infuscata is a butterfly in the family Lycaenidae. It is found in southern Nigeria, the Republic of the Congo, Uganda (from the western part of the country to Bwamba) and north-western Tanzania. The habitat consists of primary forests.

References

Butterflies described in 1964
Deudorigini